Magic Playgrounds in New Zealand's Geyserland is a 1935 New Zealand promotional documentary film.

Synopsis
This documentary shows the following tourist attractions around Rotorua -
Blue Baths, golf course, mud pools, Maori village, Waikite Geyser, Maori carvings, crafts such as weaving, St Faith’s Church Ohinemutu, memorial to Queen Victoria at Ohinemutu, water skiing on Lake Rotoiti, trout fishing, in lake & stream, Lake Tarawera, Mount Tarawera and Lake Rotomahana with its steaming cliffs.

Production
This film was produced  for the New Zealand Government Tourist Office.

Reviews
 1935 Southland Times - "The Magic Playgrounds" has pride of place in the program of "Shorts" at the Regent.

References

1935 films
1930s New Zealand films
Films shot in New Zealand
New Zealand documentary films
New Zealand short films